This is the list of winners and nominees of the César Award for Best Director (French: César du meilleur réalisateur).

History

Superlatives

Winners and nominees

1970s

1980s

1990s

2000s

2010s

2020s

Multiple wins and nominations

The following individuals received two or more Best Director awards: 

The following individuals received three or more Best Director nominations:

See also
Lumières Award for Best Director
Magritte Award for Best Director
European Film Award for Best Director
Academy Award for Best Director
BAFTA Award for Best Direction

References

External links 
  
 César Award for Best Director at AlloCiné

Director
Awards for best director